Ovett is a surname. Notable people with the surname include:

 Freddy Ovett (born 1994), British-born Australian cyclist
 Nick Ovett (born 1967), British luger
 Steve Ovett (born 1955), British track athlete